The 4th House of Orléans, sometimes called the House of Bourbon-Orléans to distinguish it, is the fourth holder of a surname previously used by several branches of the Royal House of France, all descended in the legitimate male line from the dynasty's founder, Hugh Capet. The house was founded by Philippe I, Duke of Orléans, younger son of Louis XIII and younger brother of Louis XIV, the "Sun King".

From 1709 until the French Revolution, the Orléans dukes were next in the order of succession to the French throne after members of the senior branch of the House of Bourbon, descended from Louis XIV. Although Louis XIV's direct descendants retained the throne, his brother Philippe's descendants flourished until the end of the French monarchy. The Orléanists held the French throne from 1830 to 1848 and are still pretenders to the French throne today.

The House of Orléans has a cadet branch in the House of Orléans-Braganza, founded with the marriage between Isabel of Braganza, Princess Imperial of Brazil, and Prince Gaston of Orléans, Count of Eu. Although never reigning, the House of Orléans-Braganza has claimed the Brazilian throne since 1921, and are second in line in the Orleanist line of succession.

History

Background
It became a tradition during France's ancien régime for the duchy of Orléans to be granted as an appanage to a younger (usually the second surviving) son of the king. While each of the Orléans branches thus descended from a junior prince, they were always among the king's nearest relations in the male line, sometimes aspiring to the throne itself, and sometimes succeeding.
Since they had contemporaneous living descendants, there were two Bourbon-Orléans branches at court during the reign of Louis XIV. The elder of these branches consisted of Prince Gaston, Duke of Anjou, younger son of king Henry IV, and the four daughters of his two marriages.

Prince Gaston became the Duke of Orléans in 1626, and held that title until his death in 1660. Upon the death of Gaston, the appanage of the Duchy of Orléans reverted to the Crown. His nephew, Louis XIV, then gave Gaston's appanages to his younger brother Prince Philippe, who became Duke of Orléans. At court, Gaston was known as Le Grand Monsieur ("The Big Milord"), and Philippe was called Le Petit Monsieur ("The Little Milord") while both princes were alive.

Creation

Philippe and his second wife, the famous court writer Elizabeth Charlotte of the Palatinate, founded the modern House of Bourbon-Orléans. Before then, Philippe had been styled as the Duke of Anjou, like Prince Gaston. Besides receiving the appanage of Orléans, he also received the duchies of Valois and Chartres: Duke of Chartres became the courtesy title by which the heirs apparent of the Dukes of Orléans were known during their fathers' lifetimes. Until the birth of the king's son, the Dauphin Louis, the Duke of Orléans was the heir presumptive to the crown. He was to maintain a high position at court till his death in 1701.

Their surviving son, Philippe II served as the regent of France for the young Louis XV.
As a fils de France, Philippe's surname was de France. Upon his death, his son inherited the Orléans dukedom, but as a petit-fils de France.  His surname d'Orléans (used also by his descendants) was taken from his father's main title. The first two dukes, as son and patrilineal grandson, respectively, of a French king, were entitled to be addressed as Royal Highness. But Philippe I was primarily known as Monsieur, the style reserved at the French court for the king's eldest brother.

Philippe II was succeeded as duke by his only legitimate son, Louis d'Orléans, who was entitled to the style of Serene Highness as a prince du sang. After 1709, the heads of the Orléans branch of the House of Bourbon ranked as the premier princes du sang – this meant that the dukes could be addressed as Monsieur le Prince (a style they did not, however, use). More importantly, should there be no heir to the Crown of France in the king's immediate family, then the Orléans family would ascend by right the throne.

Prince du sang
In 1709, the 5th prince de Condé died. He was the premier prince du sang and head of the House of Bourbon-Condé. As a result of this death, the title of premier prince passed to the House of Orléans, as they were closer in blood to the throne of France. But since the two senior males of that line held higher rank as, respectively, fils de France and petit-fils de France, they did not make use of the title and had no need of its attached prerogative; a household and retinue maintained at the expense of the Crown.

The Orléans household was already large, as it held the staff of Philippe II d'Orléans and of his wife, as well as the staff of his widowed mother, the dowager Duchess. This combined household, though not fully functional until 1723, contained almost 250 members including officers, courtiers, footmen, gardeners, and even barbers.

The Regency
On the death of Louis XIV in September 1715, the new king, Louis XV, was but five years old. The country was then governed by the new king's older relative Philippe II d'Orléans as the regent of France. This period in French history is known as the Regency (La Régence), and gave the House of Orléans the pre-eminent position and political role in France during the king's minority. The regent ruled France from his family residence in Paris, the Palais-Royal. He installed the young Louis XV in the Palais du Louvre which was opposite the Palais-Royal.

In January 1723 Louis XV gained his majority and began to govern the country on his own. The young king moved the court back to Versailles and in December, Philippe II died and his son, Louis d'Orléans succeeded him as 3rd duke and, more importantly, as France's heir presumptive. Nonetheless, since his rank by birth (as a great-grandson of a French king) was prince du sang, that of premier prince du sang constituted a higher style, of which he and his descendants henceforth made use.

Under Louis XV
Louis d'Orléans was in several ways his father's opposite, being retiring by nature and extremely devout. Although still in his twenties when widowed, he did not remarry after his wife's death, and is not known to have ever taken a mistress. He died in the Monastery of St. Geneviève in Paris.

His son, Louis Philippe I, Duke of Orléans, was the fourth of his line to hold that title. After having a distinguished military career, he decided to live quietly with his mistress (later, his morganatic wife), the marquise de Montesson, at the Château de Sainte-Assise.

Louis XVI
Louis Philippe I d'Orléans and his wife Louise Henriette de Bourbon had two children: the fifth duke, Louis Philippe II d'Orléans, known to history as Philippe Egalité, and Bathilde d'Orléans. As the duc de Chartres, Louis Philippe II, Duke of Orléans, married one of his cousins, Louise Marie Adélaïde de Bourbon. She was the sole heiress of the House of Bourbon-Penthièvre, which had accumulated vast wealth bestowed, despite their bar sinister, on the princes légitimés by their father, Louis XIV. The duchesse de Chartres had a dowry of six million livres,  and an annual allowance of over 500,000 livres, . Upon the death of her father she inherited the remainder of the Bourbon-Penthièvre revenues and châteaux.

Louis Philippe II was given the surname Egalité ("Equality") when French titles of nobility were abolished in 1790. His wife outlived him by almost thirty years.

Louise Marie Thérèse Bathilde d'Orléans married Louis Henry II, Prince of Condé, the last of his house, and was the mother of the duc d'Enghien, who was executed by Napoleon. She died in 1822, the same year as her sister-in-law the duchesse d'Orléans. They were both buried in the Chapelle royale de Dreux.

French Revolution
At the time of the French Revolution, Philippe Egalité, was the only person of royal blood to actively support the revolution.

He went so far as to vote for the execution of his cousin, King Louis XVI, an act which earned him popularity among the revolutionaries, and the undying hostility of many French monarchists. He remained in prison until October, the beginning of the Reign of Terror. He was shortlisted for a trial on 3 October, and effectively tried and guillotined in the space of one day, on the orders of Maximilien Robespierre.

Most of the Orléans family were forced to flee. The new duc d'Orléans had fled to Austria several months previously, triggering the arrest of his father. His brother, the duc de Montpensier, would die in England, and his sister fled to Switzerland after being imprisoned for a while. The youngest brother, Louis-Charles, Count of Beaujolais, was thrown into a prison in the south of France (Fort-Saint-Jean in Marseille) in 1793, but later escaped to the United States. He too died in exile. Of the Orléans, only the widow of Philippe Egalité was able to remain in France unhindered until, in 1797 she, too, was banished to Spain along with the few remaining Bourbons who still lived in France.

In 1814 during the Bourbon Restoration, the three remaining members of the family, the duc d'Orléans, his mother and sister, returned to Paris. The family's properties and titles were returned to them by Louis XVIII.

July Monarchy
In 1830, following the French July Revolution, the House of Orléans became the ruling house when the monarch of the elder restored Bourbon line, Charles X, was replaced by the 6th duke, Louis Philippe III d'Orléans, son of Philippe Egalité. Louis Philippe ruled as a constitutional monarch, and as such was called King of the French, rather than "of France". His reign lasted until the Revolution of 1848, when he abdicated and fled to England.

Even after his ouster, an Orléanist faction remained active, supporting a return of the House of Orléans to power. Legitimist monarchists however continued to uphold the rights of the elder line of Bourbons, who came close to regaining the throne after the fall of the Second Empire. In the early 1870s, a majority of deputies in the National Assembly were monarchists, as was the nation's president, MacMahon. Thus, it was widely expected that the old dynasty would be invited to re-mount the throne, in the person of either the Bourbon or the Orléans claimant.

To seize this opportunity the Orléanists offered a so-called fusion, whereby King Louis Philippe's grandson and heir, Philippe, comte de Paris, accepted the childless Legitimist pretender's right to the throne, thereby potentially uniting French royalists in support of a single candidate. But the refusal of the last male of Louis XIV's direct line, the comte de Chambord, to accept the tricolore as France's flag under a restored monarchy proved an insurmountable obstacle to his candidacy.

Although the Orléans had reigned under the tricolor without objection, this time the Orléans princes did not abandon the cause of the head of their dynasty by seeking to offer themselves as alternative candidates; by the time Chambord died and the Orléans felt free to re-assert their claim to the throne, the political moment had passed, and France had become resolutely republican. France has had neither a Bourbon nor Orléans monarch since 1848.

Louis-Philippe and his family lived in England until his death in Claremont, Surrey. Like his mother, he and his wife, Amelia (1782–1866), were buried at the Chapelle royale de Dreux. In 1883, the comte de Chambord died without children. As a result, some Legitimists recognized the House of Orléans as the heirs to the throne of France.

However, a portion of the Legitimists, still resentful of the revolutionary credentials of the House of Orléans, transferred their loyalties to the Carlist heirs of the Spanish Bourbons, who represented the most senior branch of the Capetians even though they had renounced their claim to the French throne to obtain Spain in 1713.

Thus to their supporters, not only are the heads of the House of Orléans the rightful heirs to the constitutionalist title of "King of the French", but also to the Legitimist title of "King of France and Navarre".

Heads of the House

|-
| 10 May 16619 June 1701()
| 
| 21 September 1640Saint-Germain-en-LayeSon of and Queen Anne of Austria
|  Henrietta of England3 children Elizabeth Charlotte of the Palatinate3 children
| 9 June 1701Saint-CloudAged 60
| Created Duke of Orléans by Louis XIV, King of France
| 
|-
| 9 June 17012 December 1723()
| 
| 2 August 1674Saint-CloudSon of and Elizabeth Charlotte of the Palatinate
| Françoise Marie de Bourbon8 children
| 2 December 1723VersaillesAged 49
| Son of (proximity of blood)
| 
|-
| 2 December 17234 February 1752()
| 
| 4 August 1703VersaillesSon of and Françoise Marie de Bourbon
| Auguste of Baden-Baden8 children
| 4 February 1752ParisAged 48
| Son of (primogeniture)
| 
|-
| 4 February 175218 November 1785()
| 
| 12 May 1725VersaillesSon of and Auguste of Baden-Baden
|  Louise Henriette de Bourbon3 children Charlotte-Jeanne Béraud de La Haye de RiouChildless
| 18 November 1785Seine-PortAged 60
| Son of 
| 
|-
| 18 November 17858 September 1792(Renounced to nobility after )
| 
| 13 April 1747Saint-CloudSon of and Louise Henriette de Bourbon
| Louise Marie Adélaïde de Bourbon5 children
| 6 November 1793ParisExecuted for treasonAged 46
| Son of (primogeniture)
| 
|-
! colspan=7 | Louis Philippe II continued to be the informal head of the House until his execution in 1793; after that his son Louis Philippe III claimed his titles.
|-
| 6 November 179326 August 1850()
| 
| 6 October 1773ParisSon of and Louise Marie Adélaïde de Bourbon
| Maria Amalia of Naples and Sicily10 children
| 26 August 1850Claremont, Surrey, EnglandAged 76
| Son of (primogeniture)
| 
|-
| (Philip VII, if king)26 August 18508 September 1894()
| 
| 24 August 1838ParisSon of and Helene of Mecklenburg-Schwerin
| Marie Isabelle of Orléans8 children
| 8 September 1894Stowe House, Buckinghamshire, EnglandAged 56
| Grandson of 
| 
|-
| (Philip VIII, if king)8 September 189428 March 1926()
| 
| 6 February 1869Twickenham, LondonSon of and Marie Isabelle of Orléans
| Maria Dorothea of AustriaChildless
| 28 March 1926PalermoAged 57
| Son of (primogeniture)
| 
|-
| (John III, if king)28 March 192625 August 1940()
| 
| 4 September 1874ParisSon of and Françoise of Orléans
| Isabelle of Orléans4 children
| 25 August 1940LaracheAged 65
| Great-grandson of Cousin and brother-in-law of 
| 
|-
| (Henry VI, if king)25 August 194019 June 1999()
| 
| 5 July 1908Le Nouvion-en-ThiéracheSon of and Isabelle of Orléans
| Isabelle of Orléans-Braganza11 children
| 19 June 1999CherisyAged 90
| Son of 
| 
|-
| (Henry VII, if king)19 June 199921 January 2019()
| 
| 14 June 1933Woluwe-Saint-PierreSon of and Isabelle of Orléans-Braganza
|  Marie-Thérèse of Württemberg5 children Micaela Cousiño Quiñones de LeónChildless
| 21 January 2019DreuxAged 85
| Son of (primogeniture)
| 
|-
| (John IV, if king) since 21 January 2019  
| 
| 19 May 1965ParisSon of and Marie-Thérèse of Württemberg
| Philomena de Tornos Steinhart  5 children
| 
| Son of 
| 
|}

Contemporary family

The current head of the house is Jean, Count of Paris (born 1965), who is a claimant to the French throne as John IV. For the Orléanists, his pretense is due to being the heir of King Louis Philippe of the French. For Legitimists, his pretense is due to being the heir of Henri, comte de Chambord, and so of Charles X of France.

Present family

On 5 July 1957, Henri, Count of Paris married Duchess Marie Thérèse of Württemberg (born 1934), another descendant of King Louis Philippe. He received the title Comte de Clermont. Five children were born from this union, before the marriage ended in divorce.

 Princess Marie Isabelle Marguerite Anne Geneviève of Orléans (born 3 January 1959, Boulogne sur Seine) married civilly at Dreux on 22 July 1989 and religiously in Friedrichshafen on 22 July 1989 to Prince Gundakar of Liechtenstein (born 1 April 1949, Vienna), of whom she has five children
 Princess Léopoldine Eléonore Thérèse Marie of Liechtenstein (born 27 June 1990, Vienna)
 Princess Marie Immaculata Elisabeth Rose Aldegunde of Liechtenstein (born 15 December 1991, Vienna)
 Prince Johann Wenzel Karl Emmeran Bonifatius Maria of Liechtenstein (born 17 March 1993, Vienna)
 Princess Margarete Franciska Daria Wilhelmine Marie of Liechtenstein (born 10 January 1995, Vienna)
 Prince Gabriel Karl Bonaventura Alfred Valerian Maria of Liechtenstein (born 6 May 1998, Vienna)
 Prince François Henri Louis Marie of Orléans (born 7 February 1961, Boulogne sur Seine – died 30 December 2017), Comte de Clermont, was severely disabled (due to mother's toxoplasmosis during pregnancy).
 Princess Blanche Elisabeth Rose Marie of Orléans (born 10 September 1962, Ravensburg), severely disabled (due to the same cause as her elder brother).
 Prince Jean Charles Pierre Marie of Orléans (born 19 May 1965, Boulogne sur Seine), Duke of Vendôme and Dauphin de Viennois, married civilly in Paris on 19 March 2009 and religiously at the Cathédrale Notre-Dame at Senlis on 2 May 2009 to Philomena de Tornos Steinhart (born 19 June 1977, Vienna), with whom he has five children
 Prince Gaston Louis Antoine Marie of Orléans (born 19 November 2009, Paris)
 Princess Antoinette Léopoldine Jeanne Marie of Orléans (born 28 January 2012, Vienna)
 Princess Louise-Marguerite Eléonore Marie of Orléans (born 30 July 2014, Poissy)
 Prince Joseph Gabriel David Marie of Orléans (born 2 June 2016)
 Princess Jacinthe Elisabeth-Charlotte Marie of Orleans (born October 2018)
 Prince Eudes Thibaut Joseph Marie of Orléans (born 18 March 1968, Paris), Duke of Angoulême, married civilly at Dreux on 19 June 1999 and religiously in Antrain on 10 July 1999 to Marie-Liesse Claude Anne Rolande de Rohan-Chabot (born 29 June 1969, Paris), with whom he has two children
 Princess Thérèse Isabelle Marie Eléonore (born 23 April 2001, Cannes)
 Prince Pierre Jean Marie d'Orléans (born 6 August 2003, Cannes)

Jean, Count of Paris, is now the head of the house.

Wealth and finances

Appanages
Throughout the years of the ancien régime, the Orléans household received vast riches in terms of wealth and property. Philippe de France obtained for the House of Bourbon-Orléans, during the rule of his brother Louis XIV, the following:
 The ducal titles of Orléans, Valois, Chartres and the lordship of Montargis. This occurred in 1660, shortly after the death of Gaston, Duke of Orléans, who had no male descendants. The family might also have obtained the county of Blois and with it the Château de Blois, Château de Chambord and also the governorship of Languedoc but Philippe de France was refused these by his brother.
 In 1672, Louis XIV added the duchy of Nemours, the countships of Dourdan and Romorantin, and the marquisates of Coucy and Folembray.
 In 1692, Philippe's son and heir, Philippe II, married Françoise-Marie de Bourbon, a legitimated daughter of Louis XIV by his liaison with Madame de Montespan. In order to convince his brother to allow his son to marry one of his illegitimate daughters, the king gave him the Palais-Royal, which Philippe I had already occupied since his first marriage, and promised him a dowry of two million livres. This palace became the Paris residence of the Dukes of Orléans until 1792.
 The Orléans canal, built by Philippe de France, was used by the family to transport their timber from the Orléans forest to the capital where it was sold. The canal was nationalised during the revolution.

Under the regent, Philippe II, d'Orléans:
 He quietly increased his wife's annual allowance to 400,000 livres while he was in power. He also bought many buildings around Paris, although many were sold by his grandson. It was also he who bought the Regent Diamond (also known as Le Régent), which was kept at the Louvre in Paris.

Under Louis d'Orléans:
 In 1740, Louis XV added the Hôtel de Grand-Ferrare at Fontainebleau
 The king added the countship of Soissons in 1751 and the lordships of Laon, Crépy and Noyon.
 By 1734, the family's income exceeded one million livres annually in rents due from the ducal domains of Orléans, Valois, Chartres, and the lordship of Montargis. Sales of timber from such vast tracts as the Orléans forest, added 500,000 livres.

Under Louis Philippe I d'Orléans:
 Rents came in from the towns of La Fère, Marle, Ham, Saint-Gobain, the Hôtel Duplessis-Châtillon and from the Ourcq canal.

Because the Dukes of Orléans were also the premier princes du sang, the kingdom's treasury paid for their personal household of 265 staff and officers. Along with towns and buildings, the family derived income from its forests on the ducal lands at Orléans, Beaugency, Montargis, Romorantin, Dourdan, Bruadan, Villers-Cotterêts (at which they had a château), Laigne, Coucy, La Fère, Marle, and Saint-Gobin.

 The original appanage was returned to the Orléans family in May 1814 by Louis XVIII. It was united with the domain of the Crown upon Louis-Philippe d'Orléans' accession to the throne in 1830, at which time it was worth about 2.5 million francs in annual income.

Residences
Philippe I and his wife had to spend most of their time at the royal court of his brother Louis XIV. For this purpose they had apartments at the Palace of Versailles, the Château de Saint-Germain-en-Laye, the Palace of Fontainebleau and the Château de Marly, as did most other members of the House of Bourbon. Their private home, given to them by the king, was the Palais Royal, Paris. Furthermore, Philippe I had bought the Château de Saint-Cloud, located between Paris and Versailles, in 1658. Later he replaced it with a new baroque building, including vast gardens on the Seine River. He also had a number of smaller rural properties. Louis Philippe I, Duke of Orléans, sold the Palais Royal and the Château de Saint-Cloud to King Louis XVI, shortly before the Revolution, however still occupying an apartment at the Palais Royal. Their private residences then became the Château du Raincy and the Château de Sainte-Assise at Seine-Port.

Before the court was officially moved to Versailles, and before the birth of his nephew, the king's son, the Dauphin Louis de France, in 1661, the Duc d'Orléans' apartments in the Palace of Versailles were where the Dauphin's now are located. The apartments looked over the Parterres du Midi of the south and were directly under the Grand Appartement de la reine. After the dauphin's birth, the Orléans had to move to the north wing and occupied large quarters there. These looked out onto the Parterres du Midi of the south. The family also had apartments where the modern day Galerie des batailles are. This area was used by the duc himself, his second wife, Elizabeth Charlotte of the Palatinate, his son, Philippe II and daughter-in-law, Françoise-Marie de Bourbon. The apartments of the family were later moved to the bottom floor of the north wing, opposite the Chapelle Royal de Versailles, this time looking over the Parterres du Midi of the north. The family had been moved in order to accommodate three of Louis XV's daughters, Madame Adélaïde, Madame Victoire and Madame Élisabeth. The family remained there till the French Revolution.

Inheritances

Along with their government allowances and because the family were known as the Premier Princes du Sang, they often received fortunes and titles from inheritances:
 In 1693 after the death of Philippe's older cousin, La Grande Mademoiselle.
 From this the family received the ducal titles of Montpensier, Châtellerault, the marquessate of Mézières-en-Brenne, the counties of Mortain, of Bar-sur-Seine, the viscountcies of Auge and of Domfront.
 In addition, he also received the barony of Beaujolais, which was later raised to the rank of county, and the principality of Joinville.
 In 1769, Louise Marie Adélaïde de Bourbon, the greatest heiress of her time as the sole surviving child of her father, the famously wealthy duc de Penthièvre, married her cousin, Louis Philippe II d'Orléans, then duc de Chatres and later called Philippe Égalité.
 After the wedding, the Duke of Orléans received his wife's dowry of six million livres, the equivalent of around £20,000,000 today.
 The Orléans couple then obtained an annual income of 240,000 livres. This later increased to 400,000 livres. The couple also received furniture as part of the marriage settlement.
 The death of the duc de Penthièvre.
 In 1793 the wealthy duc de Penthièvre died and left his whole fortune and lands to his daughter Louise Marie Adélaïde. His previous heir had been his son, the prince de Lamballe, who died young in 1768.

Châteaux
The family also later acquired many other châteaux around the country. Among these were the:
 Château de Bagnolet in Paris. This was bought in 1719 by the "Regent", Philippe II, Duke of Orléans, but was sold in 1769 by his grandson.
 Château du Raincy – bought in 1769 by the father of Philippe Égalité.
 Château de Maison-Rouge at Gagny – bought in 1771 from the Marquis de Montfermeil, it was confiscated during the revolution.
 Château de Sainte-Assise at Seine-Port was given as a present by Louis Philippe d'Orléans, Duke of Orléans, to his morganatic wife, Madame de Montesson. After his death, she sold it to the Count of Provence (the future Louis XVIII), in 1787.
 Château de Saint-Leu, in the Val-d'Oise area of France. This would later be bought by Louis Bonaparte and his wife.
 Louis Philippe II, Duke of Orléans, also acquired the land in the north east of Paris that became the Parc Monceau.

Upon the death of the Duc d'Orléans's father-in-law in 1793 (the hugely wealthy duc de Penthièvre), the House of Orléans became the richest in France, however not for a long time. During the French Revolution the surviving members of the House of Orléans sought refuge in exile and their properties were confiscated and mostly resold to new owners. After the Bourbon Restoration of 1815 some of the properties were restituted to the Orléans branch of the Bourbons.

During the July Monarchy, the now reigning royal family acquired the:
 Château de Neuilly – on the borders of 18th-century Paris.
 Château de Maison-Rouge in Gagny – this was given back to the family whilst the Bourbon-Orléans were on the throne of France.
 Château de La Ferté-Vidame – this had also been confiscated during the French Revolution and was the property of Louise Marie Adélaïde de Bourbon-Penthièvre. She had inherited it from her father. On her death it passed to her son, the future King Louis-Philippe of the French.

After King Louis Philippe I had died in exile in Claremont House, Surrey, in 1850, his property in the French Second Republic was split between his many children and grandchildren. All male members of the House of Orléans were exiled from France by law between 1886 and 1950. When Henri, Count of Paris (1908–1999), returned to France in 1950, he didn't find much property left, except for a few castles which produced no income. Having 11 children and divorcing his wife, he decided, in 1974, to transfer the most important family assets to a family foundation, Fondation Saint-Louis, in order to save them from future inheritance distribution and taxes. The respective head of the House of Orléans is honorary chairman of the foundation. Its assets comprise Château d'Amboise (with a family museum), the Château de Bourbon-l'Archambault and the Château de Dreux (private residence), with the Chapelle royale de Dreux, the necropolis of the Orléans royal family. He sold further property, resulting in legal action by his sons, and still died heavily in debt.

Cadet branches

House of Orléans-Braganza

On 15 October 1864 at Rio de Janeiro the eldest son of Louis Charles Philippe Raphael d'Orléans, Duke of Nemours, (son of King Louis Philippe of France) married Dona Isabel, Princess Imperial of Brazil, eldest daughter and heiress of Emperor Dom Pedro II of Brazil.

It was from that marriage the royal house of Orléans-Braganza was formed. Today they are the present claimants to the throne of the former Empire of Brazil, which ended with the Brazilian Imposition of the republic, on 15 November 1889 after a military coup d'état headed by Marshall Deodoro da Fonseca, the 1st President of Brazil.

House of Orléans-Galliera

In the Affair of the Spanish Marriages, Louis Philippe arranged for the marriage of his youngest son, Antoine, Duke of Montpensier, to Infanta Luisa Fernanda of Spain, younger sister of Isabella II of Spain. It was generally thought that she would succeed her sister as queen, since the Spanish queen's prospective husband was the effeminate Francis, Duke of Cádiz.

The British wanted a prince of Saxe-Coburg-Gotha for the Spanish princess, and claimed that her future children with Montpensier would not be able to succeed to the French throne, due to the Treaty of Utrecht, wherein Montpensier's ancestor the Duke of Orleans renounced his rights to succeed to the Spanish throne for himself and his descendants. Louis Philippe opposed this interpretation and claimed that the only purpose of the Treaty of Utrecht was to keep France and Spain separate.

On 10 October 1846, Montpensier married Infanta Luisa, on the same day her sister Isabella II married Cádiz. However, the marriage of Isabella II produced many children. Montpensier funded the rebels, which helped to overthrow the government of his sister-in-law. However, the Cortes elected Amadeo of Savoy instead of him.

Montpensier was later reconciled to the restored Bourbons, and his daughter married Alfonso XII of Spain, son of Isabella II. Montpensier's son, Infante Antonio, successfully claimed the succession to the dukedom of Galliera, from which this branch takes its name.

Notes

References

Further reading

External links
 Official website of the Count of Paris
 

 
House of Bourbon (France)
Dukes of Orléans
Duchesses of Orléans
Dukes of Guise